Siemiatkowski Glacier is a glacier about 25 miles (40 km) long, flowing northwest to Nickerson Ice Shelf on the coast of Marie Byrd Land. Mapped from surveys by the United States Geological Survey (USGS) and U.S. Navy air photos (1959–65). Named by Advisory Committee on Antarctic Names (US-ACAN) for Edmond R. Siemiatkowski, auroral physicist at Byrd Station, 1964.

Blake Peak is on the southwest side of the glacier.

References

Glaciers of Marie Byrd Land